The 1984 Wimbledon Championships was a tennis tournament played on grass courts at the All England Lawn Tennis and Croquet Club in Wimbledon, London in the United Kingdom. It was the 98th edition of the Wimbledon Championships and were held from 25 June to 8 July 1984.

To celebrate the centenary of the Ladies' Singles competition, first held in 1884, 17 of the surviving 20 singles champions were presented with an engraved crystal vase on Centre Court by Prince Edward, Duke of Kent and Katharine, Duchess of Kent on Monday, 2 July. Those presented were Martina Navratilova, Virginia Wade, Chris Evert Lloyd, Evonne Goolagong Cawley, Ann Jones, Billie Jean King, Margaret Court, Angela Mortimer, Maria Bueno, Althea Gibson, Shirley Fry, Doris Hart, Louise Brough, Margaret duPont, Pauline Betz, Alice Marble and Kitty Godfree. Karen Susman, Helen Jacobs and Helen Wills did not attend, but were all presented with their crystal individually during the 1984 Olympics in Los Angeles by Mrs Godfree, when she attended the games with members of the All England Club committee.

Prize money
The total prize money for 1984 championships was £1,461,896. The winner of the men's title earned £100,000 while the women's singles champion earned £90,000.

* per team

Champions

Seniors
In all five senior disciplines, the 1983 champions successfully defended their titles.

Men's singles

 John McEnroe defeated  Jimmy Connors, 6–1, 6–1, 6–2
 It was McEnroe's 6th career Grand Slam singles title and his third Wimbledon singles title.

Women's singles

 Martina Navratilova defeated  Chris Evert Lloyd, 7–6(7–5), 6–2
 It was Navratilova's 26th career Grand Slam title and her 5th Wimbledon singles title.

Men's doubles

 Peter Fleming /  John McEnroe defeated  Pat Cash /  Paul McNamee, 6–2, 5–7, 6–2, 3–6, 6–3
 It was Fleming's 7th career Grand Slam title and his fourth and last Wimbledon title. It was McEnroe's 14th career Grand Slam title and his 7th Wimbledon singles or doubles title.

Women's doubles

 Martina Navratilova /  Pam Shriver defeated  Kathy Jordan /  Anne Smith, 6–3, 6–4
 It was Navratilova's 27th career Grand Slam title and her 11th Wimbledon title. It was Shriver's 8th career Grand Slam title and her 4th Wimbledon title.

Mixed doubles

 John Lloyd /  Wendy Turnbull defeated  Steve Denton /  Kathy Jordan, 6–3, 6–3
 It was Lloyd's 3rd and last career Grand Slam title and his 2nd Wimbledon title. It was Turnbull's 9th and last career Grand Slam title and her 3rd Wimbledon title.

Juniors

Boys' singles

 Mark Kratzmann defeated  Stefan Kruger, 6–4, 4–6, 6–3

Girls' singles

 Annabel Croft defeated  Elna Reinach, 3–6, 6–3, 6–2

Boys' doubles

 Ricky Brown /  Robbie Weiss defeated  Mark Kratzmann /  Jonas Svensson, 1–6, 6–4, 11–9

Girls' doubles

 Caroline Kuhlman /  Stephanie Rehe defeated  Viktoria Milvidskaia /  Larisa Savchenko, 6–3, 5–7, 6–4

Singles seeds

Men's singles
  John McEnroe (champion)
  Ivan Lendl (semifinals, lost to Jimmy Connors)
  Jimmy Connors (final, lost to John McEnroe)
  Mats Wilander (second round, lost to Pat Cash)
  Jimmy Arias (fourth round, lost to Tomáš Šmíd)
  Andrés Gómez (quarterfinals, lost to Pat Cash)
  Yannick Noah (withdrew before the tournament began)
  José Luis Clerc (withdrew before the tournament began)
  Henrik Sundström (second round, lost to Mark Edmondson)
  Anders Järryd (first round, lost to Scott Davis)
  Kevin Curren (fourth round, lost to Pat Cash)
  Johan Kriek (fourth round, lost to Paul Annacone)
  Tomáš Šmíd (quarterfinals, lost to Ivan Lendl)
  Bill Scanlon (fourth round, lost to John McEnroe)
  Vitas Gerulaitis (fourth round, lost to John Sadri)
  Tim Mayotte (fourth round, lost to Jimmy Connors)

Women's singles
  Martina Navratilova (champion)
  Chris Evert Lloyd (final, lost to Martina Navratilova)
  Hana Mandlíková (semifinals, lost to Chris Evert Lloyd)
  Pam Shriver (quarterfinals, lost to Kathy Jordan)
  Zina Garrison (second round, lost to Virginia Wade)
  Kathy Jordan (semifinals, lost to Martina Navratilova)
  Manuela Maleeva (quarterfinals, lost to Martina Navratilova)
  Kathy Horvath (second round, lost to Bettina Bunge)
  Wendy Turnbull (fourth round, lost to Kathy Jordan)
  Jo Durie (quarterfinals, lost to Hana Mandlíková)
  Lisa Bonder (third round, lost to Elizabeth Sayers)
  Claudia Kohde-Kilsch (fourth round, lost to Chris Evert Lloyd)
  Barbara Potter (fourth round, lost to Pam Shriver)
  Helena Suková (fourth round, lost to Hana Mandlíková)
  Andrea Temesvári (fourth round, lost to Carina Karlsson)
  Carling Bassett (third round, lost to Anne Hobbs)

References

External links
 Official Wimbledon Championships website

 
Wimbledon Championships
Wimbledon Championships
Wimbledon Championships
Wimbledon Championships